Schistura carletoni is a species of ray-finned fish in the stone loach genus Schistura. It is found in the Beas River basin of Himachal Pradesh India, located in small streams with a fast current in shallow water over gravel or rocky beds.

References

carletoni
Fish described in 1924